Lieutenant-Colonel Dr. (Dent.) Edouard "Eddy" Blondeel  (25 January 1906 – 23 May 2000) was the wartime commander of the Belgian 5th SAS. After the war he was first Commanding Office of the 1st Regiment of Parachutists. He retired from the army in 1947 to work as an engineer with Wiggins Teape.

Early life

Eddy Blondeel was born in Ghent on January 25, 1906. He initially studied at the German School in Ghent but in 1914 with the outbreak of World War I, his parents no longer wanted him to be educated at a German school, leading to their decision to enroll him in a bilingual Belgian school.

In his youth he had excelled at basketball, fencing and rowing and at the age of 13 he had taken up scouting, which he claimed "helped develop his character." Before the Second World War he was appointed Commissioner of Scouts in the Flanders area of Belgium. Later he was to study Engineering at Ghent University and from these differing environments his linguistic abilities were developed.

He fulfilled his National Service in an Artillery Regiment, where he was promoted from private to sergeant in under a year.

After his time as a conscript he set up practice as an engineer, but felt he wanted to be more involved in serving people. In 1934 he decided to study medicine and specialize in dentistry. Hard work gained him a diploma with distinctions at the University of Brussels, and he won a scholarship that enabled him to continue his medical studies at Northwestern University near Chicago. He subsequently earned a doctorate in Dentistry.

World War II
In 1940 he received orders to report to Joliette in Quebec, Canada, the rallying centre for Belgians living in North America. There he inspired his compatriots with tremendous enthusiasm and fighting spirit as they underwent training with the Canadian Army. In 1942, he was appointed to command the Belgian company that was to embark in June of that year to Britain. In England his whole unit without exception volunteered to form the Belgian Independent Parachute Company. The men trained at various locations, including the parachute school at Ringway (near Manchester), the airborne centre at Hardwick and the glider base at Brize Norton. In 1943, the Belgians underwent a course based at Inverlochy Castle and completed their training in Scotland with other Paratrooper units. These included the 3rd and 4th French Parachute Battalions (the latter commanded by the one-armed Commandant Bourgoin) as well as 1st and 2nd (British) SAS.

Blondeel was said to be popular leader and had an exceptional memory. Some said he had a charming, slightly eccentric side. It was said that in the hours before dawn, when his squadron was due to drop behind enemy lines, a light would be seen burning in his hut; there he was found polishing up his Russian verbs in preparation for the link up with Soviet forces.

On 28 August 1944, Blondeel, then a Major, was parachuted into the Ardennes forest. An advanced party had sent a signal advising against anyone joining them, as the enemy was so thick on the ground. Blondeel, however, in typical style insisted on going in view of the speed with which the battle was moving. His leadership and courage inspired the local Maquis as well as his own men. By a series of successful ambushes, Blondeel and the men under his command did much to delay and harass the withdrawal.

In 1944, it was decided that the Belgian SAS Paratroopers were to be kept in reserve. Blondeel believed this would be for some operations in Belgium. That view changed when he was informed by Brigadier McLeod (Commanding officer of the SAS Brigade) that the Belgian authorities did not want the Belgian SAS to be the first into Belgium. Blondeel did not understand and visited the Belgian authorities in London to find out why. Brigadier McLeod also found the Belgian government's stance odd but as a result could now only plan for Belgian drops in France. It was decided a total of 14 squads of Belgian parachutists would be dropped in France. Blondeel grew tired of the politics going on in the background and gave an officer called Lt. Renkin a mission to get in contact with the Belgian resistance. Renkin was dropped in France and passed the frontier into Belgium. When Blondeel heard by radio that he had passed the frontier, he asked Brigadier McLeod, if he could be dropped with some men to join Renkin. When Blondeel pointed out the drop zone on a map the Brigadier's response was 'But, this drop zone is in Belgium'. 'Oh' Blondeel answered nonchalantly 'I hadn't noticed'. 'OK' the Brigadier replied, "In that case I didn’t notice either". So Blondeel was dropped with some men in Belgium at Gedinne. His squad was almost immediately in action with the resistance when he received a message from London stating that 'The Belgian government are not happy' but by that stage the deed had already been done. After the war Blondeel explained that he believed the reasons were largely down to Jean-Baptiste Piron as he had desperately wanted his Brigade to be the first in Belgium.

Regardless, shortly after this Belgian operation, the Squadron traveled to Brussels and Blondeel visited home where he saw his wife and two little daughters again for the first time in five years. This he would later recall was his best memory of the war. From 20–23 December 1944 a detachment of armed jeeps under Blondeel's command reconnoitered in the Marche area of Italy, under the general use of the 29th Armoured Brigade. From 28 December – 14 January 1945 they operated in the same role under the 6th Airborne Division with marked success. It was thanks to Blondeel's organization and training that the unit adapted so well to a new role and integrated effectively with British troops. He was determined that his Squadron should successfully accomplish any task offered to it.

The Squadron arrested numerous Nazi war criminals, including Joachim von Ribbentrop (in Hanover by Belgian SAS Sergeant Jacques Goffinet) and helped in the arrest of the Dönitz Government in Flensburg. Just before the German surrender, Blondeel's squadron was operating near Godensholt in Germany when he was ordered to undertake an operation, which could have resulted in heavy casualties. However, just as the patrol was setting out, the order was received to cease all hostilities! Blondeel called everyone together for a celebration feast and sat down at the piano playing classics and popular war melodies, ending with Auld Lang Syne. 'We must now face the uncertainties and complexities of peace', he remarked.

Later life
Blondeel faced great difficulties in a small country like Belgium, hindered by bureaucracy and politics (it is said he never promoted to the rank of General due to some politicians' dislike of him). Before leaving the Army he made sure that his wartime unit was not disbanded, and set up the Belgian SAS Regimental Association, of which he was elected president. In 1947, Blondeel took up engineering again in a paper company. It was taken over by Wiggins Teape in 1974 but Blondeel stayed on there and eventually retired in 1981 at the age of 75.

In later years, he continued to serve Belgium in many ways. He was appointed General Commissioner for Scouts, elected Governor of the Belgian Rotary club and President of Mars and Mercure (a reserve officers association). He also accepted various visiting academic posts in Canada and the United States.

Personal life
He married, in 1932, Elza Francisca Van Gorp and they had two daughters. In 2000 he died in Brussels, aged 94.

Awards and decorations

 Commander of the order of the crown
 Commander of the order of the Leopold II with palm
 Officer of the order of Leopold with palm
 War cross WWII with palm
 Commemorative medal of WWII with crossed swords

 Officer of the legion of honor (France)
 Distinguished Service Order (United Kingdom)
 War cross with palm (France)
 War cross (Luxembourg)
 Bronze Lion (Netherlands)
 France and Germany star (United Kingdom)
 Defence medal (United Kingdom)
 War Medal 1939-1945

References

British Army personnel of World War II
Free University of Brussels (1834–1969) alumni
Ghent University alumni
Feinberg School of Medicine alumni
Belgian soldiers
1906 births
2000 deaths
Military personnel from Ghent

Recipients of the Croix de guerre (Belgium)
Commanders of the Order of the Crown (Belgium)
Commanders of the Order of Leopold II
Officiers of the Légion d'honneur
Companions of the Distinguished Service Order
Recipients of the Croix de Guerre 1939–1945 (France)
Recipients of the Bronze Lion
Belgian people in the United Kingdom during World War II
Northwestern University Dental School alumni
Special Air Service officers
Belgian Army officers